Pisar is a surname. Notable people with the surname include:

Jozef Pisár (born 1971), Slovak football striker
Samuel Pisar (1929–2015), Polish-born American lawyer and author

See also
Pisal